Temnocora candida, the bigeye snailfish, is a species of snailfish native to the far northern Pacific Ocean where it is found at depths of from .  This species grows to a length of  SL.  This species is the only known member of its genus.  The Bigeye snailfish is usually found around sand, pebbles, and rocky bottoms. It is also harmless to humans.

References

Liparidae
Monotypic fish genera
Fish described in 1912